Calytrix sapphirina is a species of plant in the myrtle family Myrtaceae that is endemic to Western Australia.

It mostly blooms between August and November producing pink-blue-purple star-shaped flowers.

Found on sand plains, ridges and undulating slopes in an area in the extending from the Mid West through the Wheatbelt and into the Goldfields-Esperance regions of Western Australia where it grows on sandy soils over laterite or ironstone.
 
The species was first formally described by the botanist John Lindley in 1839 as part of his work A Sketch of the Vegetation of the Swan River Colony. Various synonyms exist including Calycothrix lasiostachya as described by Ferdinand von Mueller in 1859 in Fragmenta Phytographiae Australiae, Calycothrix sapphirina by Johannes Conrad Schauer in 1843 in Monographia Myrtacearum Xerocarpicarum and Calytrix lasiostachya as described by George Bentham in 1867 as part of the article Orders XLVIII. Myrtaceae- LXII. Compositae. in the work Flora Australiensis.

References

Plants described in 1839
sapphirina
Flora of Western Australia